The 2016 Toronto FC season was the 10th season in club history. Toronto FC finished 3rd and qualified for the playoffs for the second consecutive season. By defeating the Philadelphia Union 3–1 in the Eastern Conference Knockout Round, the club earned their first ever playoff victory, and by defeating New York City FC 7–0 on aggregate, they reached their first ever Eastern Conference Final against their Canadian rivals Montreal Impact. The club set a BMO Field attendance record of about 36,000 for the second leg of the Conference Final as the club was able to use temporary seats in the south end that were originally installed for the 104th Grey Cup. Montreal won the first leg of the Conference Championship, 3–2 at the Olympic Stadium in Montreal on November 22. Toronto later beat Montreal 5–2 in extra time in the return leg at BMO Field in Toronto on November 30, winning on an aggregated score of 7–5, making Toronto FC the first Canadian team to compete in an MLS Cup Final. On December 10, Toronto lost the final at BMO Field in front of another record-breaking 36,045 fans, to the Seattle Sounders 5–4 on penalties following a goalless draw after extra time.

Background 

During the 2015 season, Toronto FC finished sixth out of ten teams in the Eastern Conference. They qualified for the playoffs for the first time, losing 3–0 in the knockout round to the Montreal Impact.

Squad 

As of December 1, 2016.

Transfers

In

Draft picks 
Draft picks are not automatically signed to the team roster. Only those who are signed to a contract will be listed as transfers in. Only trades involving draft picks and executed after the start of 2016 MLS SuperDraft will be listed in the notes.

Loan In

Out

Competitions

Preseason

Major League Soccer

League tables

Eastern Conference

Overall

Results summary

Results by round

Matches

MLS Cup Playoffs

Canadian Championship

Competitions summary

Goals and assists 
Correct as of December 10, 2016

Clean sheets 
Correct as of December 10, 2016

Disciplinary record 
Correct as of December 10, 2016

Recognition

MLS Team of the Week

MLS Player of the Week

End of Season awards

References

External links 
2016 Toronto FC season at Official Site

Toronto FC seasons
Toronto FC
Tor
Toronto FC